Thomas Bostock Whinney (1860 – 7 May 1926) FRIBA was an English architect based in London who became the chief architect of the Midland Bank.

History
He was born in 1860, the son of Frederick Whinney of Regent's Park Road, London. He was educated at Charterhouse School.

He was appointed Fellow of the Royal Institute of British Architects, and had his offices at 8 Old Jewry, London. Later he was in partnership as Whinney, Son and Austen Hall

He married Sydney Margaret Dickens, daughter of Charles Dickens, Jr., on 30 July 1895 at St Andrew's Church, Fulham. Their children were:
Margaret Dickens Whinney (1897–1974) who wrote books on British sculpture and architecture.
Humphrey Charles Dickens Whinney (1899–1982)
Philip Charles Dickens Whinney (1901–1959)

He died on 7 May 1926 and left an estate of £65,107 10s. 1d..

Works
Midland Bank, Stow Hill/Tredegar Place, Newport, South Wales 1896–97 
Midland Bank, High Street/Albion Place, Southampton 1900
Midland Bank, North Street, Brighton 1902
Midland Bank, London Street, Norwich 1902–03 
Midland Bank, Western Road, Brighton 1905
London City and Midland Bank, The Cross, Gloucester 1905–07 
Midland Bank, Wallgate, Wigan 1910 alteration
Midland Bank, Cornfield Road/Terminus Road, Eastbourne 1910–11 
London, City and Midland Bank, 15–16 Long Row, Nottingham 1911.
Midland Bank, Bath Street/Longden Street, Sneinton, Nottingham 1911.
Midland Bank, Linthorpe Road, Middlesbrough 1912
London City and Midland Bank, High Street, Oakham 
Midland Bank, 2 Market Place, Cirencester 1915–16
War memorial, London City and Midland Bank, Threadneedle Street, London 1921 
Midland Bank, Golders Green Road, Golders Green, London 1921 
Bank extension, 6 Victoria Street, Nottingham 1920–21 (two right hand bays)
Midland Bank, 49 and 51, Corn Street, Bristol 1922
Midland Bank, Henley on Thames, 1924

References

19th-century English architects
20th-century English architects
Architects from London
1860 births
1926 deaths
People educated at Charterhouse School
Fellows of the Royal Institute of British Architects